Afterwords is the seventh studio album by Atlanta-based rock band Collective Soul, released on August 28, 2007. The album was released digitally in the iTunes Store and physical copies of the album were available only at Target Stores following an exclusive deal the band made with the chain.  The album was later re-released at all retail locations on December 9, 2008 with three new tracks written by Ed Roland.

Track listing

Personnel 
The following people contributed to Afterwords:
Ed Roland – lead vocals, guitar, keyboards, producer
Dean Roland – rhythm guitar
Will Turpin – bass guitar, percussion
Joel Kosche – lead vocals on "I Don't Need Anymore Friends", lead guitar, producer, engineer
Ryan Hoyle – drums, percussion, programming
Shawn Grove – producer, mixing, engineer
Anthony J. Resta – producer, keyboards, guitar
Karyadi Sutedja – mixing on "Hollywood", engineer
Cheney Brannon – tambourine on "What I Can Give You"
Jay Condiotti – engineer
Stephen Marcussen – mastering
Stewart Whitmore – editing
Matt Lehman – design
Richie Arpino – photography
Jeremy Cowart – photography

References 

2007 albums
Albums produced by Ed Roland
Collective Soul albums
Self-released albums